Gleneden Beach  is an unincorporated community in Lincoln County, Oregon, United States. It is located on the Oregon Coast five miles south of Lincoln City, just south of the Salishan Spa and Golf Resort, along U.S. Route 101.

Climate
This region experiences warm (but not hot) and dry summers, with no average monthly temperatures above .  According to the Köppen Climate Classification system, Gleneden Beach has a warm-summer Mediterranean climate, abbreviated "Csb" on climate maps.

See also

 Gleneden Beach State Recreation Site

References

External links
Gleneden Beach State Recreation Site

Oregon Coast
Unincorporated communities in Lincoln County, Oregon
Seaside resorts in Oregon
Unincorporated communities in Oregon
Populated coastal places in Oregon